Kenneth Johnson (born October 17,1977) better known by his stage name Omillio Sparks is an American rapper and actor from West Philadelphia. As an actor, he is best known for portraying the character "Baby Boy" in the 2002 Roc-A-Fella film State Property.

Discography
Sparks started his career off as a member of State Property and signed a recording contract with Jay-Z's record label Roc-a-Fella Records along with Beanie Sigel and others. Sparks and the group also starred in films such as the self-titled State Property and State Property 2. He was also in the soundtrack to the film and on later group albums. Sparks appeared on many albums as a guest before releasing his debut in 2007 entitled The Inauguration, and his second solo album,which charted on the US Billboard R&B albums chart, entering in at number 80 and staying for six weeks. The Payback by Sparks, charted at 80th on the Top R&B/Hip-Hop Albums chart.

Filmography
State Property (2002)
State Property 2 (2005)
Soulful (2007)
What We Do (2008)
Streets (2011)
Murder City Angels (2016)
 State Property 3 (2018) 
 215 Miladelphia (2018)

References

External links
[ allmusic.com]

Omillo Sparks Interview

African-American male rappers
Living people
Rappers from Philadelphia
Roc-A-Fella Records artists
1974 births
21st-century American rappers
21st-century American male musicians
21st-century African-American musicians
20th-century African-American people